Leonora Baroni (December 1611 – 6 April 1670) was an Italian singer, theorbist, lutenist, viol player, and composer.

Biography
She was the daughter of Adriana Basile, a virtuosa singer, and Mutio Baroni. Leonora Baroni was born at the Gonzaga court in Mantua. She sang alongside her mother and sister Caterina at court and across Italy, including cities such as Naples, Genoa, and Florence. She was admired not only for her skill as a musician, in which she almost overshadowed her mother, but also for her learning and refined manners. Baroni was honored by poets such as Fulvio Testi and Francesco Bracciolini, who addressed poems to her, as did some nobles, such as Annibale Bentivoglio and then-cardinal Pope Clement IX. These poems were collected and published as Applausi poetici alle glorie della Signora Leonora Baroni in 1639 and reprinted in 1641. John Milton later wrote a series of epigrams to her, entitled Ad Leonoram Romae canentem.

In 1633, Baroni moved with her mother to Rome, where she sang at many salons in the Palazzo Barberini. On 27 May 1640 Baroni married Giulio Cesare Castellani, Cardinal Francesco Barberini's personal secretary.

In February 1644, Baroni moved to the French court of Anne of Austria briefly, but by April 1645 she was back in Rome, where she was a chamber singer. Apparently she was not admired in Paris, perhaps because her Italian style of ornamented singing was too foreign to the court there.

None of Baroni's compositions survive, but the French traveller and viol player André Maugars mentioned her compositions while praising the musical understanding of her singing.

Notes

References
 
 
 Suzanne G. Cusick, "Leonora Baroni", The Norton/Grove Dictionary of Women Composers. Edited by Julie Anne Sadie and Rhian Samuel. W.W. Norton and Company, New York, 1995.  (page 37)
 L. Pannella, «BARONI, Eleonora (Leonora, Lionora), detta anche l'Adrianella o l'Adrianetta». In : Dizionario Biografico degli Italiani, Vol. VII, Roma : Istituto della Enciclopedia Italiana, 1965, ad vocem (on-line)

1611 births
1670 deaths
17th-century Italian composers
17th-century Italian actresses
17th-century Italian women singers
Italian women classical composers
Italian Baroque composers
Italian lutenists
Theorbists
Viol players
Italian stage actresses
17th-century women composers